This is a list of programs that are currently and formerly broadcast by MTV Classic (formerly known as VH1 Classic).

Current programming

Music video blocks
All programming listed is currently 6 hour-long automated blocks of videos:

Special events

Award shows

Former programming

Former programming by VH1 Classic

Former programming by MTV Classic

Music video blocks

Music series

Comedy series

Reality series

Animated series

Celebrity series

Competitive series

See also
 List of programs broadcast by MTV
 List of programs broadcast by MTV2

References

External links

MTV Classic